Royal Mint Court is a building complex with offices and 100 shared-ownership homes in East Smithfield, in London's East End, close to the City of London financial district.

The site was the home of the Royal Mint from 1809 until 1967 and was earlier the site of a Cistercian abbey, built in 1348 and known in its time as Eastminster. Eastminster's foundations are relatively well preserved and visible in the partially open basement of the site.

After the Dissolution of the Monasteries, the 5.5 acre (2 hectare) property was used as a victualling yard for the Royal Navy, then as a tobacco warehouse, before becoming a mint in 1809. After the mint relocated, the site was redeveloped in 1987 by the Crown Estate Commissioners with a new office and residential block added to the complex alongside the two remaining Grade II listed mint buildings. The 100 residential homes were Leasehold properties and Her Majesty Queen Elizabeth II was the Superior Landlord.

In 2017, Royal Mint Court was again set to be redeveloped with plans for a new office, shopping and leisure complex. Planning permission was granted in July 2016. However, in May 2018 the site was sold to the People's Republic of China to be used for their new London embassy. As the Freeholder, the PRC became the Superior Landlord over the 100 leasehold homes. Sir David Chipperfield was appointed as the architect for development of the site with some critics questioning if this was his most controversial job.

History

During the Black Death in 1349 the site became a plague cemetery known as the Churchyard of the Holy Trinity, and three mass burial trenches and 14 grave rows were dug alongside a small chapel. During excavation of the site between 1986 and 1988 the remains of 762 bodies were recovered, as well as a number of belt buckles and two hoards of coins. On 20 March 1350 Edward III granted the site to the Cistercian order for the building of a new chapel named the Royal Free Chapel of St Mary Graces on Tower Hill, which eventually became the Abbey of St. Mary de Graces; the monastery was known as Eastminster, or sometimes New Abbey. Built to house just ten monks and an abbot, the abbey was the last Cistercian foundation in England to be built before the Dissolution of the Monasteries. In 1538 St Mary Graces was surrendered to the Crown and sold to Sir Arthur Darcy, who demolished part of the monastery buildings and lived there until his death in 1560. The site was then sold back to the Crown; it was a victualling yard for the Royal Navy until 1739, when the navy moved to new premises in Deptford.

The Royal Mint 

The Royal Mint, previously housed in the Tower of London, moved to the site between 1806 and 1811, and the Mint's new buildings were finished by the end of 1809. The main building, designed by James Johnson and completed by Robert Smirke, contained apartments for the Deputy Master of the Mint, the Assay Master, and the Provost of the Moneyers as well as bullion stores and the Mint Office. In addition to the main building, the site included two gatehouses, buildings housing machinery, and dwelling houses for officers and staff. A boundary wall surrounded the site. A narrow alley known as the Military Way ran along the inside of the wall, patrolled by the Royal Mint's military guard. In the 1880s the machinery buildings were reconstructed and extended, and there was further rebuilding at the turn of the century. By the 1960s little of the original mint remained apart from the Smirke building and gatehouses.

The Royal Mint Refinery 
In 1848, a Royal Commission examined the efficiency of the Royal Mint and recommended that the Royal Mint separate the process of refining gold and striking gold coins and that refining be leased to an agency that was external to the Royal Mint. Anthony de Rothschild (1810-1876) was very enthusiastic about the opportunity to manage the gold refinery and on 26 January 1852 he wrote to the Deputy Master of the Mint of his readiness to 'execute the Lease for the Refinery. On 3 February 1852, a Lease for the buildings and equipment was sanctioned and the Royal Mint Refinery became part of Rothschild's London businesses' interests for over a century'. Prior to receiving the Lease, the Rothschilds had a long history of gold trading in Paris and London and in 1815 they famously provided the Duke of Wellington with gold coins to pay his soldiers prior to the Battle of Waterloo. In 1825, the Rothschilds came to the aid of the Bank of England when a number of English banks collapsed causing a run on the Bank. Using family connections, they were able to purchase gold from European banks.

The Royal Mint Refinery proved to be a huge success for the Rothschilds as new gold finds in California and Australia brought a wave of new supplies of gold into London in the 1850s. By the 1890s the operations were so successful that  they were able to acquire the freehold of the Royal Mint Refinery, which had previously been Leased to them. They also purchased freehold properties on Royal Mint Street and other locations close to the refinery and these were provided as housing for workers and their families. In 1894, Alfred de Rothchild, 1st Lord Rothschild acquired a plot of freehold land in Cartwright Street from the Metropolitan Board of Works on the understanding it would be kept for at least eighty years 'Artisans Dwellings' to accommodate 100 workmen at the refinery.

Rothschild, through its connection to the refinery, gained access to and control over Empire gold, which in 1914 accounted for 70 per cent. of world output; the majority of which was shipped to London and treated at the Rothschild refinery. Operations continued through the first and second world wars until the 1960s when the refinery was no longer viable and in 1965 the copper foil plant was sold to Brush Clevite followed two years later by the sale of the entire business to  Engelhard Industries Limited.  In November 1968, the last Rothschild employee of the refinery left the building and closed the gate on 19 Royal Mint Street.

In 2018, the Land Registry Extract for Royal Mint Court, Title Number EGL198329 contained, 'A Conveyance dated 10 April 1929 of the land tinted blue on the title plan made between (1) The King's Most Excellent Majesty (2) The Commissioners of the Crown Lands and (3) Lionel Nathan de Rothchild and Anthony Gustav de Rothschild excluded the walls on the north .........and west sides therof and the recess marked A, B on the plan annexed to the conveyance under the arch in the west wall thereof.'''

The Title also includes, 'A Licence dated 11 December 1962 made between (1) Her Majesty's Postmaster general and (2) Edmund Leopold de Rothschild, Leopold David de Rothschild, Evelyn Robert Adrian de Rothschild and Rothschild Continuation Limited relates to the erection and maintenance of a security fence'. Post Royal Mint 
The Royal Mint was based at the site until 1967, when it began moving to its current site in Llantrisant, Wales. Minting ceased at Royal Mint Court in 1975. Two new office buildings were constructed on the site in the 1980s. Designed by Sheppard Robson, they were subsequently known as Murray House and Dexter House. This brought the site's total office space to 460,000 square feet (4.3 hectares). Smirke's 1809 building ceased to be used by the Royal Mint in January 2000. After the Mint vacated the Murray House building on the site it was used as commercial offices by Barclays Global Investors which paid £5 million rent annually, and was later sublet to Deloitte and Old Mutual until the tenancy expired at the end of 2014.

Leases for the offices were granted to Gulldale Limited a company incorporated in the Isle of Man which took a mortgage based on income from the properties. The Royal Mint Court mortgage was securitised as part of a £401,340,000 Barclays Capital-issued Commercial Mortgage Backed Security (CMBS) called Equinox Eclipse 2006-1 sold in 2006. The maturity due date for these notes was January 2018.The value of the leaseholds fell afterwards leaving the securitised loan with an unpaid balance of £69.5m, while the B-loan, held by a private individual investor, had £14m outstanding balance, against a less than £32.5m valuation for the Royal Mint Court leasehold. It was reported that bondholders of this did not consider it economically attractive to sell the leasehold for Royal Mint Court.  On 6 March 2014, Gulldale Limited was placed into administration in England. In so doing, Gulldale became the first Isle of Man incorporated company with the centre of main interest in the Isle of Man to be placed into administration in England.

 Sale of the Royal Mint Freehold to Delancey 
In 1994, a company led by the billionaire George Soros, G Soros Realty Investors, acquired £1.34 million British Land shares at 298p from a Quantum Fund holding. Documents issued by British Land did not disclose this, but did reveal that Mr John Ritblat received 2 million shares at cost from the Quantum Fund. When the matter was made public in June 1993, Mr Ritblat's share issuance was defended as providing an incentive for British Land to perform. An early deal for Soros and Ritblat was for the Broadgate complex in the City of London in 1994.

In 1998, in a complicated deal, one of George Soros's Quantum hedge funds from the tax-efficient British Virgin Islands pumped £127m into Delancey Estates. Quantum, places money offshore for high net worth individuals, shares go to a trust for some of the Soros family, and to a Guernsey company linked to Richard Katz and his wife. The deal with Quantum would give Delancey net assets of £150m, of which £128m would be cash. Although Quantum provided financial backing for Delancey, management for the property arm of the company was to be provided by Freehold Portfolios Estates (FPE), a property advisory company owned by Jamie Ritblat.

In 2000, The Guardian reported that Delancey Estates, then a quoted George Soros-backed property vehicle, could be the next major real estate company to take itself private. The first major office investment was reported to be 6 Chesterfield Gardens, London W1 for £30m in 2003 and Soros's Morston Nominees was said to be the largest shareholder in Delancey's old Tribeca fund.

In 2005, the Guardian newspaper reported that  George Soros was embarking on a £2bn London property spree through his investments Delancey. At the time, Delancey was selling off commercial property and also sold its stake in Mapeley, the off-shore firm that owns and manages Inland Revenue buildings.   The article added that this was seen as a vote of confidence in the long-term strength of the UK commercial property market. George Soros was also investing in other businesses including a large stake in one of China's largest airlines.

Mapeley Real Estate was the subject of press coverage in 2002 when the UK Treasury Committee questioned why the Inland Revenue sold its estate of more than 600 buildings to a Bermuda-based company, and later admitted it wrongly announced the properties were sold to a UK firm; and again in 2020 when a £6.5m Government payment was made to a company in a tax haven). Sir Nicholas Montague, the Revenue's chairman told the Treasury Sub Committee his department had issued misleading information and also failed to inform parliament properly and apologised. In 2009, Mapeley warned shareholders it could go bust if it did not raise £48m as it needed to pay back £60m to Deutsche Bank in April. Following an audit by the National Audit Office in 2010, the Guardian reported that those who negotiated the 20-year deal with Mapeley were inept and had deprived the UK of income when everyone living in the country was having to pay more tax and austerity to pay for bailout of the banks in 2008, and should hang their heads in shame.  Mapeley was owned by Fortress Investment Group, USA, Soros Real Estate, Netherlands and Delancy East Ltd, UK, but was later based offshore in Bermuda. The Strategic Transfer of the Revenue properties to the Private Sector was expected to save A$860m (£344m) over the 20-year contract period.

Whilst the Barclays mortgage for Royal Mint Court and subsequent CMBS had been secured against commercial leases held by Gulldale Limited, in 2009, the Crown Estate approved the sale of the freehold land and buildings of Royal Mint to DV4, a wholly owned subsidiary of Delancey for £51m. However, the sale completion date was deferred until June 2010 and the sale was to remain confidential until that date. DV4 was an offshore company incorporated in the British Virgin Islands appears in the Panama Papers.

The majority of the Royal Mint Court commercial site became vacant in early 2013. In 2014 LRC Group paid £49.5 million for a debt secured on the long leasehold title for the site. In 2015 the site was occupied by squatters as a protest against homelessness.

Delancey's freehold interest gave the company the power to block new tenants and 2015 Delancey and LRC agreed a joint venture in 2015 to redevelop the site. In 2016 planning permission was granted for the Grade II-listed building to be refurbished and the site redeveloped into an office, shopping and leisure complex. In 2016, a dispute over right to light occurred between the freeholder RMC FH Co and Metropolitan Housing Trust. The court considered whether Metropolitan as a long leaseholder had the right to release a neighbouring residential development from a right to light. The judge held that the long leaseholder was prevented from doing so by the terms of the lease and found in favour of the freeholder who had obtained planning permission to redevelop Royal Mint Court.

 Sale of the Freehold to the People's Republic of China 
In May 2018 Delancey and LRC sold the site to the People's Republic of China for conversion into their new London embassy. CBRE announced that its combined team worked with the Chinese Embassy for many years to identify a suitable site and the embassy was patient and considered in its search for a location that met all its requirements. CBRE bought the freehold site from Delancey and LRC Group. In November 2020, the media agency acting for the Chinese Embassy sent its first letter to residents in the local community notifying them of initial plans for redevelopment of the site. The letter and proposals for the site excluded any plan for the land upon which the 100 homes Stand. The redevelopment was welcomed however the letter was met with some criticism in the community.

 Concerns about transparency and human rights 
In 2018, constituents that have homes on the land now owned by the PRC wrote to UK government ministers to express their concerns about the original sale by the Crown Estate and to ask for legal and diplomatic assistance to communicate with their new superior landlord. This included an appeal to Jeremy Hunt MP, then Foreign Secretary, for his help, claiming that the local government, Delancey and the Chinese Ambassador had not communicated with citizens on the land. They said, "These actions and omissions by the UK Government and Tower Hamlets give grounds to suspect that public officials are failing to respect and protect the human rights of individuals who reside in Leasehold homes at St Mary Graces Court. On the face of it, it appears the Government are discriminating against us as social housing tenants and showing favouritism to the Chinese Ambassador and PRC".

The letter went on to say that the outcome being sought was one of just satisfaction by returning to leaseholders at Royal Mint Court the security of their properties that was afforded when The Queen was their superior landlord. It also quoted a speech given in East London on 5 March 2018 by then Prime Minister Theresa May MP in which she spoke of the need to make housing ownership fairer and more equitable.

The correspondence followed a report in the East London Advertiser newspaper that John Briggs, the Mayor of Tower Hamlets and Chief Executive Will Tuckley had welcomed Chinese Ambassador Liu Xiaoming and a delegation of Chinese diplomats and participated in a ceremony at Royal Mint Court. The families residing at Royal Mint Court were not invited to the event.

In 2020, the plan was opposed by some local councillors and residents, due to China's crackdown on Uyghur Muslims.

In an article in The Times on 22 October 2022, Lord Alton of Liverpool questioned whether it was wise to let the CCP build the embassy at Royal Mint Court saying, "The idea that the Royal Mint should become a prime site for the promotion of the CCP is wrong. It will give them a great deal of prestige and I am sympathetic to the security issues and concerns from local residents. I think the secretary of state should call it in." The article followed news that Chinese diplomats had allegedly dragged a protester called Bob Chan by his hair into the grounds of its consulate in Manchester and assaulted him. In the same article, Dave Lake, chairman of the Royal Mint Court Residents Association (RMCRA) who has lived on the site since 1990 said, "All of a sudden, the estate has been bought by the Chinese and the CCP are our freeholders. I've never heard anything like it before". He expressed concern adding, "It raises all sorts of questions. For example, if someone put up a poster supporting the local mayor, a Muslim, would they get a knock on the door from someone from the embassy? Lake questioned whether diplomatic immunity would be extended to cover the 100 homes and commercial units on the land and was concerned that neither the Leaseholders nor their Housing Association, Metropolitan Thames Valley Housing had any influence over the CCP Freeholder.                       

 Allegations of fraud 
On 31 August 2018, Jim Fitzpatrick, then Member of Parliament for Poplar and Canning Town, sent a letter to the Crown Estate in which the authors alleged fraud and malfeasance by members of the Crown Estate and their agents. These related to the off market sale of the freehold land to Delancey in 2010 and why they and organisations based in the UK that were known to be seeking freehold commercial property at the time such as the City of London Corporation and the Ambassadors of the United States of America and the People's Republic of China were not informed about the sale.

The letter also raised concern that a Crown Estate document included a comment that "An exhaustive campaign by our appointed agents, BH2, initially failed to identify a purchaser for this asset." It also raised concerns as to why Barclays had refinanced a mortgage for Gulldale Limited when Barclays was also a tenant of Gulldale Limited and the valuation placed on the leases in the Equinox Eclipse 2006-1 CMBS issuance. It also asked why Roger Bright, then CEO of the Crown Estate, did not mention the forthcoming sale of Royal Mint Court freehold and 100 homes on the land when he gave evidence to a Treasury Select Committee on 3 March 2010, prior to completion of the sale in June. Oral evidence given to the committee included details about the Crown Estates strategy of selling its social housing assets to invest in shopping centres and the relationship with Hercules Unit Trust (HUT), a property fund led by British Land. Concerns were raised about potential conflicts of interest in the relationship between British Land and the Crown Estate. HUT is a Jersey-based property unit trust which invests in properties in major retail warehouse and shopping park locations in the UK. In September 2005 it completed a £1 billion real estate securitisation. The seven-year debt issue was arranged by N M Rothschild & Sons Limited and was secured against 16 retail parks valued at over £2 billion.

When Mr Bright gave evidence, HUT run by British Land had to renegotiate the billions of pounds of securitised debt due for repayment or risk default owing to breaches of loan-to-value covenants. Founded in 1856 as an offshoot of the National Freehold Land Society (later Abbey National), British Land is one of the largest property development and investment companies in the UK. Sir John Ritblat, the founder of Delancey, acquired British Land in 1970 for £1m, and he retired as chairman in 2006.

The letter of complaint to the Crown Estate requested they refer the matter to the police or Serious Fraud Office for independent investigation as some of those suspected of wrongdoing were still their advisors or in their employment. The author of this and subsequent letters used a pseudonym of George and Mary Ordinary and stated they represented families who resided at St Mary Graces Court on the Royal Mint Court land, whose Superior Landlord had been the Crown Estate before the land title transferred to Delancey and then the PRC. The letter was also published on the Royal Mint Court Residents Association website.

On 1 October 2018, the General Counsel of the Crown Estate sent a letter to Jim Fitzpatrick stating he had looked into the matter and the allegations were highly defamatory and wholly unsubstantiated. Following a request under the Freedom of Information Act, the Crown Estate published the letters without redaction on a public website. Other documents that related to allegations were also published. These included an Investment Proposal dated 29 May 2008 recommending the sale of the freehold land and building for not less than £90m with a Risk Assessment that included details of Leases for commercial properties on the freehold land but no reference to the Head Lease Her Majesty Queen Elizabeth granted to Metropolitan Homes in 1987 and the sub-leases for 100 residential apartments and two commercial properties that are on the land. Other correspondence published included a confidential Heads of Terms for the sale for £51m; a Crown Estate Map showing the entire Royal Mint Court freehold land including the residential properties highlighted in pink, and an Investment proposal (sales) document dated 8/10/2009 that described the sale as, 'an opportunity to strengthen our relationship with Delancey, and in so doing the Ritblat family'.

In 2019, Corporate Watch published an article about the relationship that Delancey and the Ritblat family has with institutions, donations to political organisations and their use of joint ventures and companies that are incorporated in the British Virgin Islands and other offshore jurisdictions which makes it difficult to identify the ultimate beneficial owner of an entity. TruePublica published an article about Delancey's corporate structures and strategy of investing in 'build to rent' private residential property in cities beyond London.

 Involvement of Government Ministers and Lord McFall 
On 28 September 2018, Mark Field MP, then Minister of State for Asia and the Pacific sent a letter to Jim Fitzpatrick MP in response to concerns raised by his constituents who resided at Royal Mint Court stating he was not in a position to comment on the matter and the issues were outside the scope of the FCO. On 9 October 2018, a letter was sent to Mr Fitzpatrick on behalf of residents at Royal Mint Court asking him to ask Kit Malthouse MP, Minister of State for Housing to provide them with assistance in communicating with the Chinese Ambassador. On 8 February 2019, Mr Malthouse sent a letter of reply to Mr Fitzpatrick about the sale of Royal Mint Court to the PRC in which he declined to assist.

On 14 February 2019, The Rt Hon the Lord McFall of Alcluith wrote to Jim Fitzpatrick MP highlighting the conclusions of the Treasury Select Committee that he chaired in March 2010 prior to completion of the sale of Royal Mint Court in June 2010. This included a reference to the following findings, "We recommend the CEC review their community and local stakeholder consultation processes with a view to increasing transparency and engagement" and "Having regard to the wider interests at stake, and on the basis of what we have learned during the inquiry, we recommend that the CEC should examine and set out clearly how they take their good management obligations into account in decisions on residential property. More generally, we note the extent to which local stakeholders were taken by surprise by the CEC's decision to sell-off residential housing, and urge the CEC to engage more fully with key public bodies in London about their future plans for their London portfolio and their potential impact on London communities.".

In February 2010, Roger Bright, CEO of the Crown Estate faced a grilling from the Treasury Select Committee about the planned mass sell-off of social housing in London and decision to invest in out of town shopping centres. Residents in housing owned by the Crown Estate were opposed to their homes being sold. In the public record of oral and documentary evidence provided to the Treasury Select Committee by Mr Bright, there is no reference to the 100 homes at St Mary Graces Court nor any reference to the decision to finalise the sale of the Royal Mint Court to Delancey in June 2010. A list of Crown Estate properties in London included as an Appendix to the Committee report shows the commercial properties at Royal Mint Court but not the residential apartments.

 Involvement of Sir Edward Lister 
On 7 February 2021, The Sunday Times revealed that Sir Edward Lister, a close advisor to Boris Johnson helped the Chinese Government to negotiate the purchase of Royal Mint Court from Delancey. The article stated that Lister had acted on behalf of the UK Government – while being paid by both the property company representing Beijing and the developer that sold the 5.4 acre freehold site to them for £255m. When Boris Johnson was Foreign Secretary, he appointed Lister (who later became Lord Udny-Lister) to lead talks with the Chinese Government over its proposed purchase of Royal Mint Court. The story was covered by other news outlets and included a photograph of Edward Lister shaking hands with Chinese Ambassador Liu Xiaoming at a meeting in London in July 2018.  On the same date, the Daily Mail alleged that Lord Udny-Lister had a conflict of interest as he and advisor to the UK Foreign Office and was also paid as adviser to real estate giant CBRE and Delancey, who purchased the property from the Crown Estate in 2010 for £51m.

The Chinese Embassy website reported on a meeting at the Chinese Embassy on 7 November 2018 between Chargé d'Affaires Zhu Quin and Sir Edward Lister in his capacity as a Non-Executive Director of the Foreign & Commonwealth Office, to exchange views with him on the construction of the diplomatic premises in both China and the UK. The article quoted Lister as saying that 'the renovation and expansion project of the British Embassy in Beijing is one of the key building or renovation projects of the UK’s diplomatic missions overseas. The UK is willing to keep in close communication with China to make sure that their respective projects will make positive progress'.The reported role of the Foreign & Commonwealth Office and Lister in the negotiations about the Chinese Embassy's purchase of Royal Mint Court appears at odds with a statement made by Mark Field MP. In a letter dated 28 September 2018 that he wrote to Jim Fitzpatrick MP about the original sale of the site in which Field stated, "I can confirm that this was a commercial deal between the two parties and did not include the UK Government". Responding to fraud concerns raised by constituents he added, "I'm afraid I'm not in a position to comment on these as, among other things, these issues are outside the scope of the FCO's role."In May 2021, further news emerged alleging that Lord Lister advised on planning law at the same time as being employed by two major property development firms including Delancey which purchased Royal Mint Court from the Crown Estate and sold it to the People's Republic of China.

Structures
The site of Royal Mint Court comprises three buildings, two of which are original 19th century creations for the Royal Mint The third building is an interconnecting office complex built in the late 1980s after the mint relocated to Wales. There are also 100 residential apartments and three small commercial properties to the east of the site that are completely detached from the main site by a service road that runs from Royal Mint Street to East Smithfield. In addition to the buildings, there are two listed structures within the site's forecourt: a 19th-century entrance lodge built by Robert Smirke and a set of cast iron lamps on stone white plinths. and the partially exposed archaeological remains of the graves and abbey of St Mary de Graces.

Johnson Smirke Building
Designed in 1805 by James Johnson, the building was constructed between 1807 and 1812 by Robert Smirke after Johnson died, having never seen his design realised. In honour of both architects, the building was named the Johnson Smirke Building. Aiming to increase mint production, the building was designed for multiple purposes including space for new mint machinery, a bullion store, the mint's office and apartments for mint officials.

The long façade of the three-storey rectangular stone building has windows with Doric order running through the first and second floors. Above is a broad central pediment which displays the royal coat of arms engraved in stone with six columns below. The end bays are decorated with four pilasters. Due to its historic significance, the building became Grade II* listed on 27 September 1973.

Registry Building
Built around the same time as the Johnson Smirke Building, The Registry, also known as Seaman's Registry, was designed by James Johnson to house staff of the mint. The three-storey building includes an attic and basement with outer cladding that was added in the 1980s. On 15 April 1985 it became Grade II listed.

Murray House and Dexter House
Built in 1987 by architecture firm Sheppard Robson, the two connecting buildings make up a series of housing and office complexes.

 St Mary Graces Court 
Built in 1987 under a 126-year Head Lease granted by Her Majesty Queen Elizabeth via the Crown Estate Commissioners, St Mary Graces Court comprises 100 residential apartments to the west of Cartwright Street and a block on East Smithfield and Royal Mint Street. The majority of these were sold as shared ownership and some buyers purchased a 100% share. There are also 3 commercial units and car parking spaces on the site. Under the original Leases, the Crown Estate was the Superior Landlord. The name derives from the Cistercian Abbey of St. Mary de Graces, Eastminster that once stood on the site.

 Archaeological Remains of the Cistercian Abbey and Graves 
The site of the medieval Abbey was excavated between 1986 and 1988. The excavation revealed 420 burials and the remains of 389 individuals were analysed. One of the named burials was that of Sir Simon Burley, a high ranking and most influential man in the court of King Richard II. He was decapitated in 1388 for treason and his remains were buried in the Presbytery of St Mary Graces Abbey. Following excavation, parts of the walls of the abbey were left exposed beneath Murray House and these were accessible for public viewing via a path from East Smithfield. In 2017, planning permission was granted to Delancey to redevelop the site and this included increasing public access to Royal Mint Court by creating new pedestrian entrances from East Smithfield and Royal Mint Street.

On 16 December 2020, it was reported that local councillors have raised concerns about protection of the remains of the historic abbey and in December 2020, Historic England confirmed that the Greater London Archaeological Advisory Service was contacted for pre-application advice about the remains and graves beneath Royal Mint Court stating, "Any advice Historic England provide in pre-application stage is confidential" . However, Historic England added that, "the archaeology at the site was “highly important” and had been included in the same Tier 1 Archaeological Priority Area as the Tower of London and the former Royal Mint building itself is Grade II* listed". The report added that China's ambassador wrote to the borough's mayor John Biggs in November 2020 to say he believes councillors are “attempting to disrupt”'' the project.

Chinese Embassy planning application

Planning application 
On 8 February 2021, the London Borough of Tower Hamlets (LBTH) Strategic Development Committee received a virtual presentation from the Chinese Embassy and their development partner Sir David Chipperfield outlining their pre-application proposal for a fortified Chinese Embassy at Royal Mint Court. Due to COVID-19 restrictions the meeting was held online and Ms Yuzi Xia, Minister Counsellor of the Chinese Embassy in the UK was present to represent as the leader for the redevelopment project. A copy of undated public consultation letters that Ms Xia sent to citizens of the United Kingdom and other nationalities who reside at St Mary Graces Court (which is part of the overall Royal Mint Court site but not part of the planning application) were published on the consultation website.

On 1 December 2022, the application was presented to the Planning Authority. Members of the Royal Mint Court Residents Association (RMCRA) and councillors appeared on television news to express concern the plans would receive approval. CNN reported RMRCA Chairman David Lake was so fearful, he had written to King Charles asking for residents homes on the Chinese owned land to be bought back by the Crown estate.  In a shock decision, Tower Hamlets council voted unanimously to reject planning permission.  It came despite planning officials recommending the new Embassy be given consent. Councillors normally follow the recommendations of planning officials. Consent was refused on the grounds of safety to local residents following serious concerns raised by families living on the land owned by the Chinese Government.  

Fearing the Tower Hamlets decision could be overruled by the Mayor of London or central government, the Chairman of the RMCRA launched an appeal on a crowdfunding website to raise funds for professional legal advice for his residents. His appeal highlighted his fear that children and pensioners would become a Human Shield to protect the Chinese Embassy.

Public consultation 
On 4 February 2021, representatives of the London Embassy of the People's Republic of China and project team hosted a webinar for local residents on the latest designs for change of use to the Royal Mint Court site. It was announced by London Communications, a media company acting for the Chinese Embassy and David Chipperfield architects that a consultation website had been launched with the domain www.rmc-consultation.co.uk. The website included images for the embassy at Royal Mint Court and how these compared with previously consented plans for a retail, leisure and commercial development with considerable public realm.

References

Grade II listed buildings in the London Borough of Tower Hamlets
Robert Smirke (architect) buildings